Innlandet is a county in Norway. It was created on 1 January 2020 with the merger of the old counties of Oppland and Hedmark (the municipalities of Jevnaker and Lunner were transferred to the neighboring county of Viken on the same date).

The county name translates to "The Inland" which reflects that the county is the only landlocked county in Norway. The county covers approximately 17% of the total area of the mainland area of Norway. It stretches from the Viken county and the Oslo region in the south to Trøndelag county in the north. In the northwest, the county borders Møre og Romsdal and the Vestland county in the west. To the east the county borders the Swedish counties of Värmland and Dalarna.

The northern and western areas of the county are dominated by the mountainous areas Rondane, Dovrefjell and Jotunheimen. The Galdhøpiggen mountain is located within the Innlandet part of Jotunheimen and at  it is the tallest mountain in Norway. The eastern and southern areas of the county are mainly made up of forests and agricultural land. Mjøsa, Norway's largest lake, is located in the southern end of Innlandet, and Glomma the longest river in Norway also flows through the county.

Agriculture and forestry are two important industries in the county with approximately 20% of Norway's agricultural production and about 40% of timber.

The 1994 Winter Olympics were held at Lillehammer, the second-largest city in Innlandet county.

Municipalities

Innlandet County has a total of 46 municipalities:

Settlements 

Most of the settlements in Innlandet are fairly small. As of 1 January 2020 Hamar is the largest with a population of 28,434. Lillehammer, Gjøvik, Elverum, Kongsvinger and Brumunddal are the only other cities with populations above 10,000. However, Raufoss, Moelv, Vinstra, Fagernes and Otta also have city status.

Churches and parishes

The whole county belongs to the Diocese of Hamar (plus two municipalities in neighboring Viken County.

Geography

Mountains 
 Galdhøpiggen 
 Blåkampen 
 Høgvagltindene 
 Mjellknapp 
 Røykeskardhøi 
 Søndre Svarthåmåren 
 Søndre Kjølhaugen 
 Sørhellhøi 
 Sørhellhøin
 Søverhøi
 Steinahøfjellet 
 Svånåtindene, mountain range

Government

A county is the chief local administrative area in Norway. The whole country is divided into 11 counties. A county is also an election area, with popular votes taking place every 4 years. In Innlandet, the government of the county is the Innlandet County Municipality. It includes 57 members who are elected to form a county council. Since 2020, the Innlandet County Municipality has been led by Even Aleksander Hagen, the county mayor. The county also has a County Governor who is the representative of the King and Government of Norway. Knut Storberget is the current County Governor of Innlandet. The offices for the county governor are located in Lillehammer.

See also
Districts in Innlandet
Former municipalities in Innlandet
Lakes in Innlandet
Rivers in Innlandet
Towns and Cities in Innlandet
Valleys in Innlandet
Villages in Innlandet

References

External links

 
Counties of Norway
2020 establishments in Norway
States and territories established in 2020